Branko Laura (born 21 October 1982), is a Croatian futsal player who plays for MNK Split Brodosplit Inženjering and the Croatia national futsal team.

Sources
 

1982 births
Living people
Croatian men's futsal players